Sickle-gloss, or sickle sheen, is a silica residue found on blades such as sickles and scythes suggesting that they have been used to cut the silica-rich stems of cereals and forming an indirect proof for incipient agriculture. The gloss occurs from the abrasive action of silica in both wild and cultivated stems of cereal grasses, meaning the occurrence of reaping tools with sickle gloss doesn't necessarily imply agriculture. The first documented appearance of sickle-gloss is found on flint knapped blades in the Natufian culture (12,500 to 9500 BC) in the Middle East, primarily in Israel.

How sickle-gloss forms 
Sickle-gloss has been recognized as a characteristic of reaping grasses since the 1930s, at least. There is a general consensus that sickle-gloss occurs after the reaping of grasses and it may form in as little as a few hours of work. However, it may require more time to accumulate enough sickle-gloss for archaeological preservation. It is also speculated that the gloss may accumulate from cutting canes or reeds, woodworking or perhaps even hoeing or digging. It may be possible to distinguish between different types of glosses on a macro or microscopic level.

Gloss lines 
Direction of the gloss lines are relative to the work edge of a sickle. Gloss lines rarely penetrate more than 5 mm on the face of the segment. Later period sickles were more likely to show gloss patterns that were parallel or near parallel to working edges.

Importance of context 
At sites with sickle-gloss, it is reasonable to assume that there were sickles used for varying lengths of time. Sickles that lack gloss may be assumed to be unused or unfinished (since flint sickles only require a few hours to accumulate sickle-gloss.)

Controversy 
According to Lithics After the Stone Age: A Handbook of Stone Tools from the Levant, there is much debate over the actual formation of sickle-gloss, focusing on whether the gloss results from abrasive polishing of silica in the flint artifact or whether a silica coating is added from silica in the grasses that are harvested. According to "Cutting Graminae Tools and 'Sickle Gloss' Formation", there are at least four main concepts that have been invoked to try to explain the origins of sickle-gloss:
 Gloss is a result from working with plant materials in which the tool used forms a silica gel. Small plant fragments are incorporated in the gel.
 Gloss is also a result of working with plant materials in which the tool used forms a silica gel. However, the plant material is separate from the gel.
 There is a purely mechanical or chemical and mechanical character to the sickle gloss.
 Sickle gloss forms as a result of many different factors and tries to include the aforementioned ideas.

There is also debate on the meaning of the sickle-gloss, especially in understanding the rise of agriculture and the use of sickles as indicators of reaping grasses in Epipaleolithic and early Neolithic societies. This problem doesn't apply in late Neolithic societies because of their documentation of the use of sickles for agriculture.

References

Bar-Yosef, Ofer (1998), "The Natufian Culture in the Levant, Threshold to the Origins of Agriculture", Evolutionary Anthropology 6(5): 159–177, http://www.columbia.edu/itc/anthropology/v1007/baryo.pdf

Silicon dioxide
History of agriculture
Natufian culture